Pterostylis planulata, commonly known as the flat rustyhood, is a plant in the orchid family Orchidaceae and is endemic to Victoria. It has a rosette of leaves at its base and up to seven translucent flowers with green stripes. The flowers have a thin, dark green, insect-like labellum.

Description
Pterostylis planulata, is a terrestrial,  perennial, deciduous, herb with an underground tuber. The leaves are often withered by the time of flowering. Three or four stem leaves are wrapped around the flowering spike. The lateral sepals are slightly wider than the galea, densely hairy on their outer edges and suddenly taper to a thread-like tip, . The "head" end has two long bristles and there are 18 to 24 shorter bristles on the side. Flowering occurs from October to November.

Taxonomy and naming
Pterostylis planulata was first formally described in 1983 by David Jones & Mark Clements and the description was published in Muelleria. The type specimen was collected in the northern end of the Grampians National Park. The specific epithet (planulata) is derived from the Latin word planus meaning "level" or "flat" referring to the almost flat, sometimes shallowly dished, lateral sepals.

Distribution and habitat
The flat rustyhood is only known from the northern part of the Grampians National Park where it grows in shallow soil on rock ledges.

References

planulata
Endemic orchids of Australia
Orchids of Victoria (Australia)
Plants described in 1983